Madrid–Cuatro Vientos Airport , also known as Cuatro Vientos Airport, is the oldest airport in Spain, established in 1911 and one of the three civil airports of Madrid along with Madrid–Barajas and Madrid–Torrejón Airport. The name "Cuatro Vientos" translates into English as "Four Winds."

Cuatro Vientos was originally an air base, which later became also a civil airport. Thus, there is a military section located on a separate apron of the airport, opposite to the civil one. It is also used as the Madrid base for aircraft of the Spanish Police, as well as for the road traffic surveillance helicopters.

History

On 31 July 1919, an English aviator James Arthur Peters made the first non-stop flight from the UK to Spain. He flew an Alliance aircraft, a Seabird P1 that he had designed, from Hendon airport to Cuatro Vientos in 9 hours. His navigator was named as Curtiss.
He carried a letter for the Queen of Spain from Mr Gillow the owner of the company that made the aircraft.
Peters later flew back to the UK and named his house in Kings Langley, Herts. ‘Cuatro Vientos’.

Infrastructure 
This airport is mainly used by general aviation aircraft, Flight Training Organizations and flying clubs. Due to the runway length and surrounding buildings it is only possible to operate helicopters, piston engine aircraft, medium size turbo-props and small business jets. The only navigational aid is a non-directional beacon.

The Museum of Aeronautics and Astronautics, an air and space museum mainly dedicated to the Spanish Air and Space Force, is located on the southern side of the airport.

Accidents and incidents
In September 1976, Douglas C-53 T.3-57 of the Ejército del Aire was involved in an accident at Cuatro Vientos AFB and subsequently withdrawn from use.
In May 2013, a Hispano HA-200D Saeta of the Fundación Infante de Orleans crashed during an aerobatic show at Cuatro Vientos Airport. The pilot died and several people on the ground were injured.

References

External links
Madrid–Cuatro Vientos Airport (official site) 

Airports in the Community of Madrid
Airports established in 1911
1911 establishments in Spain
Buildings and structures in Latina District, Madrid